Geary, an Anglicized rendering of the Irish name O'Gadhra, has a number of meanings:


Places
 Geary, New Brunswick, Canada
 Geary, Isle of Skye, Scotland, a township
 Geary, Kansas, United States, a ghost town in Doniphan County
 Geary County, Kansas
 Geary, Oklahoma, United States, a city
 Geary River, Victoria, Australia

People
 Geary (surname)
 Geary (given name)

Other uses
 Geary Act, an 1892 U.S. government law that restricted the rights of Chinese immigrants in the United States
 Geary Boulevard, a major thoroughfare in San Francisco, California
 Geary baronets, a baronetcy in the Baronetage of Great Britain
 Geary (email client), an email application for the GNOME 3 desktop
 D. L. Geary Brewing Company, a microbrewery located in Portland, Maine
 Battery Geary, part of the defenses of Corregidor during World War II

See also
 Ambush of Geary, a 1776 American Revolutionary War skirmish
 Giri (disambiguation)